Acalyptris vepricola is a moth of the family Nepticulidae. It was described by Vári in 1963. It is known from South Africa (it was described from the Innanda District).

The larvae feed on Vepris undulata.

References

Nepticulidae
Endemic moths of South Africa
Moths described in 1963